Robert E. Kass is the Maurice Falk Professor of Statistics and Computational Neuroscience in the Department of Statistics and Data Science, the Machine Learning Department, and the Neuroscience Institute at Carnegie Mellon University.

Early life and education
Born in Boston, Massachusetts (1952), Kass earned a Bachelor of Arts degree in mathematics from Antioch College, and a PhD degree in Statistics from the University of Chicago in 1980, where his advisor was Stephen Stigler. Kass is the son of the late Harvard medical researcher Edward H. Kass and stepson of Amalie M. Kass.

Research and publications
Kass's early research was on differential geometry in statistics, which formed the basis for his book Geometrical Foundations of Asymptotic Inference (with Paul Vos), and on Bayesian methods. Since 2000 his research has focused on statistical methods in neuroscience.

Kass is a highly cited author whose best-known work includes papers on 
Bayes factors (with Adrian Raftery ),  
prior distributions (with Larry A. Wasserman), 
the relationship of Bayes and Empirical Bayes methods with Duane Steffey, 
the application of point process statistical models to neural spiking data (Kass and Ventura; DiMatteo, Genovese, and Kass), 
the challenges of multiple spike train analysis (Brown, Kass, and Mitra; Kass, Ventura, and Brown), 
the state-space approach to brain-computer interface (Brockwell, Rojas, and Kass), and the brain's apparent ability to solve the credit assignment problem during brain-controlled robotic movement (Jarosciewicz et al.)). Kass's book Analysis of Neural Data (with Emery Brown and Uri Eden) was published in 2014. 
Kass has also written on statistics education and the use of statistics, including the articles, "What is Statistics?" (with Emery Brown), "Statistical Inference: The Big Picture," and "Ten Simple Rules for Effective Statistical Practice" (with Brian Caffo, Marie Davidian, Xiao-Li Meng, and Nancy Reid).

Professional and administrative activities

Kass has served Chair of the Section for Bayesian Statistical Science of the American Statistical Association, Chair of the Statistics Section of the American Association for the Advancement of Science, founding Editor-in-Chief of  Bayesian Analysis (journal), and Executive Editor (editor-in-chief) of the international review journal Statistical Science. At Carnegie Mellon he was Department Head of Statistics from 1995 to 2004 and Interim Co-director of the joint CMU-University of Pittsburgh Center for the Neural Basis of Cognition 2015–2018.

Honors

Kass is an elected Fellow of the American Statistical Association, the Institute of Mathematical Statistics, and the American Association for the Advancement of Science. For his work on statistical modeling of neural synchrony (Kass, Kelly, Loh), in 2013 he received the Outstanding Statistical Application Award from the American Statistical Association, and in 2017 he received the R.A. Fisher Award and Lectureship (now known as the COPSS Distinguished Achievement Award and Lectureship) from the Committee of Presidents of Statistical Societies.

References

Living people
Carnegie Mellon University faculty
American statisticians
Antioch College alumni
University of Chicago alumni
Fellows of the American Statistical Association
1952 births